The 1884 New Zealand general election was held on 22 July to elect a total of 95 MPs to the 9th session of the New Zealand Parliament. The Māori vote was held on 21 July. A total number of 137,686 (60.6%) voters turned out to vote. In 11 seats there was only one candidate.

1881 electoral redistribution
The same 95 electorates that were defined through the 1881 electoral redistribution were used for the 1884 election.

Government formation
Prior to the election Harry Atkinson had served as Premier since 1883. His government was unpopular at the time and the polls went against him. Only 32 of the returned Members supported him whilst 57 opposed his government as well as 6 independents. Soon after the election his government fell in August 1884 after Robert Stout successfully passed a vote of no confidence and assumed the premiership with the support of Julius Vogel. A strong counter-offensive by Atkinson enabled him to unseat Stout again after only twelve days. Stout, however, was not so easily defeated, and took the Premiership again after seven days. This time, Stout held his position for three years, defeating Atkinson's attempts to oust him.

Results
The following table shows the results of the 1884 general election.

Notes

References